Substances, mixtures and exposure circumstances in this list have been classified by the International Agency for Research on Cancer (IARC) as group 3: The agent (mixture or exposure circumstance) is not classifiable as to its carcinogenicity to humans. This category is used most commonly for agents, mixtures and exposure circumstances for which the evidence of carcinogenicity is inadequate in humans and inadequate or limited in experimental animals. Exceptionally, agents (mixtures) for which the evidence of carcinogenicity is inadequate in humans but sufficient in experimental animals may be placed in this category when there is strong evidence that the mechanism of carcinogenicity in experimental animals does not operate in humans. Agents, mixtures and exposure circumstances that do not fall into any other group are also placed in this category.

Further details can be found in the IARC Monographs

Agents and groups of agents

A

Acenaphthene
Acepyrene
Aciclovir
Acridine orange
Acriflavinium chloride
Acrolein
Acrylic acid
Acrylic fibres
Acrylonitrile-butadiene-styrene copolymers
Actinomycin D
Agaritine
Aldicarb
Aldrin
Allyl chloride
Allyl isothiocyanate
Allyl isovalerate
Amaranth (dye)
5-Aminoacenaphthene
2-Aminoanthraquinone
para-Aminobenzoic acid
1-Amino-2-methylanthraquinone
2-Amino-4-nitrophenol
2-Amino-5-nitrophenol
4-Amino-2-nitrophenol
2-Amino-5-nitrothiazole
11-Aminoundecanoic acid
Amitrole
Ampicillin
Anaesthetics, volatile
Angelicin plus ultraviolet A radiation
Aniline
para-Anisidine
Anthanthrene
Anthracene
Anthranilic acid
Antimony trisulfide
Apholate
para-Aramid fibrils
Atrazine
Aurothioglucose (Auranofin)
2-(1-Aziridinyl)ethanol
Aziridyl benzoquinone
Azobenzene

B

11H-Benz[bc]aceanthrylene
Benz[l]aceanthrylene
Benz[a]acridine
Benz[c]acridine
Benzo[g]chrysene
Benzo[a]fluoranthene
Benzo[ghi]fluoranthene
Benzo[a]fluorene
Benzo[b]fluorene
Benzo[c]fluorene
Benzo[ghi]perylene
Benzo[c]phenanthrene
Benzo[e]pyrene
p-Benzoquinone dioxime
Benzoyl peroxide
Benzyl acetate
Bis(1-aziridinyl)morpholinophosphine sulfide
Bis(2-chloroethyl)ether
1,2-Bis(chloromethoxy)ethane
1,4-Bis(chloromethoxymethyl)benzene
Bis(2-chloro-1-methylethyl)ether
Bis(2,3-epoxycyclopentyl)ether
Bisphenol A diglycidyl ether (Aralditeâ)
Bisulfites
Blue VRS
Brilliant Blue FCF, disodium salt
Bromochloroacetonitrile
Bromoethane
Bromoform
2-Butoxyethanol
1-tert-Butoxy-2-propanol
n-Butyl acrylate
Butylated hydroxytoluene (BHT)
Butyl benzyl phthalate
gamma-Butyrolactone

C

Caffeine
Cantharidin
Caprolactam
Captan
Carbaryl
Carbazole
3-Carbethoxypsoralen
Carmoisine
Carrageenan
Chloral
Chloral hydrate
Chloramine
Chlordimeform
Chlorinated drinking water
Chloroacetonitrile
Chlorobenzilate
Chlorodibromomethane
Chlorodifluoromethane
Chloroethane
Chlorofluoromethane
3-Chloro-2-methylpropene
4-Chloro-meta-phenylenediamine
Chloronitrobenzenes
Chloropropham
Chloroquine
5-Chloro-ortho-toluidine
2-Chloro-1,1,1-trifluoroethane
Cholesterol
Chromium(III) compounds
Chromium, metallic
Chrysene
Chrysoidine
CI Acid Orange 3
Cimetidine
Cinnamyl anthranilate
CI Pigment Red 3
Citrinin
Clofibrate
Clomiphene citrate
Coal dust
Continuous glass filament
Copper 8-hydroxyquinoline
Coronene
Coumarin
m-Cresidine
Crotonaldehyde
Cyclamates
Cyclochlorotine
Cyclohexanone
4H-Cyclopenta[def]chrysene
5,6-Cyclopenteno-1,2-benzanthracene

D

D & C Red No. 9
Dapsone
Decabromodiphenyl oxide
Deltamethrin
Diacetylaminoazotoluene
Diallate
1,2-Diamino-4-nitrobenzene
1,4-Diamino-2-nitrobenzene
2,5-Diaminotoluene
Diazepam
Diazomethane
Dibenz[a,c]anthracene
Dibenz[a,j]anthracene
Dibenzo-p-dioxin
Dibenzo[a,e]fluoranthene
13H-Dibenzo[a,g]fluorene
Dibenzo[h,rst]pentaphene
Dibenzo[a,e]pyrene
Dibenzo[e,l]pyrene
Dibromoacetonitrile
Dichloroacetonitrile
Dichloroacetylene
m-Dichlorobenzene
o-Dichlorobenzene
trans-1,4-Dichlorobutene
2,6-Dichloro-p-phenylenediamine
1,2-Dichloropropane
Dicofol
Didanosine
Dieldrin
Diethanolamine
Di(2-ethylhexyl) adipate
Di(2-ethylhexyl) phthalate
N,N'-Diethylthiourea
Dihydroaceanthrylene
Dihydroxymethylfuratrizine
Dimethoxane
3,3'-Dimethoxybenzidine-4,4'-diisocyanate
p-Dimethylaminoazobenzenediazo sodium sulfonate
4,4'-Dimethylangelicin plus ultraviolet A radiation
4,5'-Dimethylangelicin plus ultraviolet A radiation
N,N-Dimethylaniline
Dimethylformamide
Dimethyl hydrogen phosphite
1,4-Dimethylphenanthrene
3,5-Dinitrotoluene
Dinitrosopentamethylenetetramine
2,4'-Diphenyldiamine
Disperse Yellow 3
Disulfiram
Dithranol
Doxefazepam
Doxylamine succinate
Droloxifene
Dulcin

E–G

Electric fields (extremely low-frequency)
Electric fields (static)
Endrin
Eosin
3,4-Epoxy-6-methylcyclohexylmethyl-3,4-epoxy-6-methylcyclo-hexanecarboxylate
cis-9,10-Epoxystearic acid
Estazolam
Ethionamide
Ethylene
Ethylene sulfide
Ethylenethiourea
2-Ethylhexyl acrylate
Ethyl selenac
Ethyl tellurac
Eugenol
Evans blue
Fast Green FCF
Fenvalerate
Ferbam
Ferric oxide
Fluometuron
Fluoranthene
Fluorene
Fluorescent lighting
Fluorides (inorganic, used in drinking-water)
5-Fluorouracil
Foreign bodies, implanted in tissues
Metallic chromium or titanium, cobalt-based, chromium-based and titanium-based alloys, stainless steel and depleted uranium
Furazolidone
Furfural
Furosemide (Frusemide)
Gemfibrozil
Glycidyl oleate
Glycidyl stearate
Guinea Green B
Gyromitrin

H–L

Haematite
HC Blue No. 2
HC Red No. 3
HC Yellow No. 4
Hepatitis D virus
Hexachlorobutadiene
Hexachlorophene
Human T-cell lymphotropic virus type II
Hycanthone mesylate
Hydralazine
Hydrochloric acid
Hydrochlorothiazide
Hydrogen peroxide
Hydroquinone
4-Hydroxyazobenzene
8-Hydroxyquinoline
Hydroxysenkirkine
Hydroxyurea
Hypochlorite salts
Insulation glass wool
Iron-dextrin complex
Iron sorbitol-citric acid complex
Isatidine
Isonicotinic acid hydrazide (Isoniazid)
Isophosphamide
Isopropanol
Isopropyl oils
Isosafrole
Jacobine
Kaempferol
Kojic acid
Lauroyl peroxide
Lead compounds, organic
Leucogentian violet
Light Green SF
D-Limonene
Luteoskyrin

M

Madder root (Rubia tinctorum)
Magnetic fields (static)
Malachite green
Malathion
Maleic hydrazide
Malonaldehyde
Maneb
Mannomustine dihydrochloride
Medphalan
Melamine
6-Mercaptopurine
Mercury and inorganic mercury compounds
Metabisulfites
Methimazole
Methotrexate
Methoxychlor
Methyl acrylate
5-Methylangelicin
Methyl bromide
Methyl tert-butyl ether
Methyl carbamate
Methyl chloride
1-Methylchrysene
2-Methylchrysene
3-Methylchrysene
4-Methylchrysene
6-Methylchrysene
N-Methyl-N,4-dinitrosoaniline
4,4'-Methylene bis(N,N-dimethyl)benzenamine
4,4'-Methylenediphenyl diisocyanate
2-Methylfluoranthene
3-Methylfluoranthene
Methylglyoxal
Methyl iodide
Methyl methacrylate
N-Methylolacrylamide
Methyl parathion
1-Methylphenanthrene
7-Methylpyrido[3,4-c]psoralen
Methyl red
Methyl selenac
Microcystis extracts
Modacrylic fibres
Monuron
Morpholine
Musk ambrette
Musk xylene

N–O

1,5-Naphthalenediamine
1,5-Naphthalene diisocyanate
Naphtho[1,2-b]fluoranthene
Naphtho[2,1-a]fluoranthene
Naphtho[2,3-e]pyrene
1-Naphthylamine
1-Naphthylthiourea (ANTU)
Nithiazide
5-Nitro-ortho-anisidine
9-Nitroanthracene
7-Nitrobenz[a]anthracene
6-Nitrobenzo[a]pyrene
4-Nitrobiphenyl
3-Nitrofluoranthene
Nitrofural (Nitrofurazone)
Nitrofurantoin
1-Nitronaphthalene
2-Nitronaphthalene
3-Nitroperylene
2-Nitropyrene
N'-Nitrosoanabasine
N'-Nitrosoanatabine
N-Nitrosodiphenylamine
para-Nitrosodiphenylamine
N-Nitrosofolic acid
N-Nitrosoguvacine
N-Nitrosoguvacoline
N-Nitrosohydroxyproline
3-(N-Nitrosomethylamino)propionaldehyde
4-(N-Nitrosomethylamino)-4-(3-pyridyl)-1-butanal (NNA)
N-Nitrosoproline
Nitrotoluenes
5-Nitro-ortho-toluidine
Nitrovin
Nodularins
Nylon 6
Oestradiol mustard
Opisthorchis felineus (infection with)
Orange I
Orange G
Oxyphenbutazone

P

Palygorskite (attapulgite) (short fibres, < 5 micrometers)
Paracetamol (Acetaminophen)
Parasorbic acid
Parathion
Patulin
Penicillic acid
Pentachloroethane
Permethrin
Perylene
Petasitenine
Phenanthrene
Phenelzine sulfate
Phenicarbazide
Phenol
Phenylbutazone
meta-Phenylenediamine
para-Phenylenediamine
N-Phenyl-2-naphthylamine
ortho-Phenylphenol
Picene
Picloram
β-Picoline
Piperonyl butoxide
Polyacrylic acid
Polychlorinated dibenzo-p-dioxins (other than 2,3,7,8-tetrachlorodibenzo-p-dioxin)
Polychlorinated dibenzofurans
Polychloroprene
Polyethylene
Polymethylene polyphenyl isocyanate
Polymethyl methacrylate
Polypropylene
Polystyrene
Polytetrafluoroethylene (Teflon)
Polyurethane foams
Polyvinyl acetate
Polyvinyl alcohol
Polyvinyl chloride
Polyvinyl pyrrolidone
Ponceau SX
Potassium bis(2-hydroxyethyl)dithiocarbamate
Prazepam
Prednimustine
Prednisone
Proflavine salts
Pronetalol hydrochloride
Propham
n-Propyl carbamate
Propylene
Ptaquiloside
Pyrene
Pyridine
Pyrido[3,4-c]psoralen
Pyrimethamine

Q–R

Quercetin
para-Quinone
Quintozene (Pentachloronitrobenzene)
Reserpine
Resorcinol
Retrorsine
Rhodamine B
Rhodamine 6G
Rifampicin
Ripazepam
Rock (stone) wool
Rugulosin

S

Saccharated iron oxide
Saccharin and its salts
Scarlet Red
Schistosoma mansoni (infection with)
Selenium and selenium compounds
Semicarbazide hydrochloride
Seneciphylline
Senkirkine
Sepiolite
Shikimic acid
Silica, amorphous
Simazine
Slag wool
Sodium chlorite
Sodium diethyldithiocarbamate
Spironolactone
Styrene-acrylonitrile copolymers
Styrene-butadiene copolymers
Succinic anhydride
Sudan I
Sudan II
Sudan III
Sudan Brown RR
Sudan Red 7B
Sulfafurazole (Sulfisoxazole)
Sulfamethazine
Sulfamethoxazole
Sulfites
Sulfur dioxide
Sunset Yellow FCF
Surgical implants
Orthopaedic implants and devices, of complex composition
Cardiac pacemakers
Dental materials
Ceramic materials
Surgical implants, female breast reconstruction, silicone
Symphytine

T

Talc, not containing asbestiform fibres
Tannic acid and tannins
Temazepam
2,2',5,5'-Tetrachlorobenzidine
1,1,1,2-Tetrachloroethane
1,1,2,2-Tetrachloroethane
Tetrachlorvinphos
Tetrakis(hydroxymethyl)phosphonium salts
Theobromine
Theophylline
Thiourea
Thiram
Toluene
Toremifene
Toxins derived from Fusarium graminearum, F. culmorum and F. crookwellense
Toxins derived from Fusarium sporotrichioides
Trichlorfon
Trichloroacetic acid
Trichloroacetonitrile
1,1,1-Trichloroethane
1,1,2-Trichloroethane
Triethanolamine
Triethylene glycol diglycidyl ether
Trifluralin
4,4',6-Trimethylangelicin plus ultraviolet A radiation
2,4,5-Trimethylaniline
2,4,6-Trimethylaniline
4,5',8-Trimethylpsoralen
2,4,6-Trinitrotoluene
Triphenylene
Tris(aziridinyl)-para-benzoquinone (Triaziquone)
Tris(1-aziridinyl)phosphine oxide
2,4,6-Tris(1-aziridinyl)-s-triazine
Tris(2-chloroethyl) phosphate
1,2,3-Tris(chloromethoxy)propane
Tris(2-methyl-1-aziridinyl)phosphine oxide

U–Z

Vat Yellow 4
Vinblastine sulfate
Vincristine sulfate
Vinyl chloride-vinyl acetate copolymers
Vinylidene chloride
Vinylidene chloride-vinyl chloride copolymers
Vinylidene fluoride
N-Vinyl-2-pyrrolidone
Vinyl toluene
Vitamin K substances
Wollastonite
Xylenes
2,4-Xylidine
2,5-Xylidine
Yellow AB
Yellow OB
Zectran
Zeolites other than erionite (clinoptilolite, phillipsite, mordenite, non-fibrous Japanese zeolite, synthetic zeolites)
Zineb
Ziram

Mixtures

 Bitumens, steam-refined, cracking-residue and air-refined
 Coffee, drinking
 Crude oil
 Diesel fuels, distillate (light)
 Fuel oils, distillate (light)
 Jet fuel
 Mate, not very hot (drinking)
 Mineral oils, highly refined
 Petroleum solvents
 Printing inks
 Tea
 Terpene polychlorinates (Strobane®)

Exposure circumstances

Calcium carbide production
 Flat-glass and specialty glass (manufacture of)
 Hair colouring products (personal use of)
 Leather goods manufacture
 Leather tanning and processing
 Lumber and sawmill industries (including logging)
 Paint manufacture (occupational exposure in)
 Pulp and paper manufacture

References

External links
 Description of the list of classifications, IARC
 List of Classifications (latest version)

 List of classifications by cancer site  (last updated on 5 November 2015)

 
Suspected carcinogens
Science-related lists

ja:IARC発がん性リスク一覧